Aspergillus albertensis is a species of fungus in the genus Aspergillus. It is from the Flavi section. The species was first described in 1985. It was isolated from a human ear in Canada. A. albertensis has been shown to produce ochratoxin A and B. It forms yellow spores.

Growth and morphology

A. albertensis has been cultivated on both Czapek yeast extract agar (CYA) plates and Malt Extract Agar Oxoid® (MEAOX) plates. The growth morphology of the colonies can be seen in the pictures below.

References 

albertensis
Fungi described in 1985